Pomegranate Seed, is an Armenian drama television series. The series premiered on Armenia TV on September 11, 2017. Since then, the series air every workday at 21:45.
The series take place in Yerevan, Armenia.

Premise 
Young Sophia's life is completely destroyed after she finds out that her boyfriend, a brave soldier and a hero, has died. Not only this news but also her father's suicide ravage Sophia's dreams and plans. Sophia's mother sold almost everything to pay her husband's debts. Moreover, she gave her two minor children to an orphanage because of the lack of normal living conditions. For living, she and her eldest daughter Sophia start working together in the governor's house as servants. In that house, Sophia meets the main villain of the film, who actually killed her boyfriend and destroyed her life.

References

External links

 
 Pomegranate Seed on Armserial

Armenian drama television series
Armenian-language television shows
2017 Armenian television series debuts
2010s Armenian television series